Westwood One is the name of two US radio networks.  

 Westwood One (1976-2011), previous incarnation
 Westwood One, current incarnation (2006–present)